Alexandra Ripley ( Braid; January 8, 1934 – January 10, 2004) was an American writer best known as the author of Scarlett (1991), written as a sequel to Gone with the Wind. Her first novel was Who's the Lady in the President's Bed? (1972). Charleston (1981), her first historical novel, was a bestseller, as were her next books On Leaving Charleston (1984), The Time Returns (1985), and New Orleans Legacy (1987).

Biography
Born Alexandra Elizabeth Braid in Charleston, South Carolina, she attended the elite Ashley Hall and received a Bachelor of Arts degree from Vassar College in Poughkeepsie, New York in 1955 with a major in Russian language. She was married three times: from 1958 to 1963 to Leonard Ripley, an early partner and recording engineer at Elektra Records, from 1971 to 1981 to Thomas Martin Garlock (1929–2008), and in 1981 to John Vincent Graham (1926–2007), a former professor at the University of Virginia, from whom she was legally separated at the time of her death.

She died of natural causes at her home in Richmond, Virginia, is survived by two daughters.

Selected works

Novels
1972: Who's the Lady in the President's Bed? (as B.K. Ripley)
1981: Charleston
1984: On Leaving Charleston
1985: The Time Returns
1987: New Orleans Legacy
1991: Scarlett
1994: From Fields of Gold
1997: A Love Divine

Non-fiction
1974: Caril (as B.K. Ripley, with Nanette Beaver & Patrick Trese)

References

External links

1934 births
2004 deaths
Writers from Charleston, South Carolina
Vassar College alumni
American women novelists
20th-century American novelists
20th-century American women writers
Novelists from South Carolina
21st-century American women